The water polo tournaments at the 2024 Summer Olympics in Paris are scheduled to run from 27 July to 11 August. Preliminary water polo matches will occur at Paris Aquatics Centre, with the final playoffs staged at the iconic Paris La Défense Arena. Similar to the previous edition, twenty-two teams (twelve for men and ten for women) will compete against each other in their respective tournaments.

Qualification
The International Olympic Committee and the World Aquatics (AQUA) have ratified and released the qualification criteria for Paris 2024. The host nation France reserves a direct quota place each in the men's and women's tournament with the remainder of the total quota attributed to the eligible NOCs through a tripartite qualification pathway.

The 2023 World Aquatics Championships, scheduled for 16 to 29 July in Fukuoka, Japan, will produce the winners and runners-up of the men's and women's water polo tournament qualifying for Paris 2024. Five further quota places will be awarded to the highest-ranked eligible NOC at each of the continental meets (Africa, Americas, Asia, Europe, and Oceania) approved by World Aquatics. If any of the continental meets does not occur within the qualifying period, the vacant spot will be entitled to the highest-ranked eligible NOC from a respective continent at the succeeding edition of the Worlds.

To complete the water polo roster for the Games, the final batch of quota places will be assigned to the four highest-ranked eligible NOCs for men and two for women at the 2024 World Aquatics Championships in Doha, Qatar.

Men's qualification

Women's qualification

Medal summary

Medal table

Events

See also
Water polo at the 2022 Asian Games
Water polo at the 2023 Pan American Games

References

 
International aquatics competitions hosted by France
2024
2024 Summer Olympics events
2024 in water polo